The discography of American heavy metal supergroup Hellyeah consists of six studio albums, one video album, fifteen singles, eight promotional singles and nineteen music videos.

Albums

Studio albums

Live albums

Compilation albums

Video albums

Singles

Promotional singles

Music videos

Notes

References

External links
 
 
 

Heavy metal group discographies
Discographies of American artists
Discography